Il nostro caro angelo (Our Dear Angel) is an album by the Italian singer and songwriter Lucio Battisti. It was released in September 1973 by Numero Uno and was Italy's second-best selling album in 1973, the first being Battisti's previous album, Il mio canto libero.

Track listing 
All lyrics written by Mogol, all music composed by Lucio Battisti.
 "La collina dei ciliegi" (Hill of Cherry Trees) – 4:58
 "Ma è un canto brasileiro" (But it's a Brazilian Song) – 5:21
 "La canzone della terra" (Song of the Dirt ) – 5:31
 "Il nostro caro angelo" (Our Dear Angel) – 4:13
 "Le allettanti promesse" (Tempting Promises) – 5:11
 "Io gli ho detto no" (I told him 'No''') – 4:21
 "Prendi fra le mani la testa" (Take Your Head Between Your Hands) – 3:54
 "Questo inferno rosa" (This Pink Hell'') – 6:54

Personnel 
 Lucio Battisti – lead vocals, guitar, piano, Fender Rhodes, percussion
 Gian Piero Reverberi – piano, synthesizer
 Bob Callero – bass
 Massimo Luca – acoustic guitar
 Gianni Dall'Aglio – drums
 Mara Cubeddu, Wanda Radicchi – chorus
 Arrangements: Lucio Battisti, Gian Piero Reverberi

References

1973 albums
Lucio Battisti albums